The 1966–67 season was the 43rd season in the existence of AEK Athens F.C. and the eighth consecutive season in the top flight of Greek football. They competed in the Alpha Ethniki, the Greek Cup, the European Cup Winners' Cup and the Balkans Cup. The season began on 1 March 1966 and finished on 30 May 1968.

Overview

The presence of AEK Athens in the Championship of the previous season may have left them with the bitterness for not winning it, but taking into account the injustice and punishments they suffered, combined with the serious issue of the abstention of Mimis Papaioannou, gave the impression that the club was ready for the new Championship race without significant transfer additions. The departures of Giorgos Petridis, Fanis Tasinos and above all, of the legendary Kostas Nestoridis, after nine active seasons at the club, did not disturb the manager, Tryfon Tzanetis, who did not proceed in any particular transfer move. Considering that the already existing roster that had been gradually acquired in the early 60's was sufficient to cope with the club's needs, procceding only in the acquisition  of the forward of Apollon Athens, Vasilis Mastrakoulis as a back-up choice to Papaioannou and Papageorgiou who had formed an irreplaceable attacking duo. As far as covering the gap in the midfield was concerned, this was filled with the definitive return to the team of the versatile Panagiotis Ventouris, after the end of his "adventure" in South Africa during the last season.

AEK started the season at the first round of the European Cup Winners' Cup. Their opponent was the Braga, who in the previous season had won their first title and made their maiden appearance in European competitions. The performance of the club in both legs was not enough as they were eliminated by 2 defeats. The Championship race started with Olympiacos, having found in the person of Márton Bukovi their own reformer, seemed unstoppable, as they achieved 11 straight victories in the same number of games. Additionally, the unexpected draw in Serres from Panserraikos, shook the management of AEK and playing their last card in the hunt for the league, removed Tzanetis from the team's bench and brought back after three and a half years the emblematic winner of the 1963 league,  Jenő Csaknády. The Hungarian-German coach made his mark from the start, when in the first two matches achieved as many victories, including a home win against Olympiacos, reducing the distance from the top to 4 points. The imposing 5–1 victory over Panserraikos on 16 April reduced the distance even more to 3 points from Olympiacos. However, five days later, the Championship was interrupted for over a month, as the football stadiums were used by the rulers of the military dictatorship, that had meanwhile been imposed on the country as gathering places for arrested dissidents. Sports matches were some of the first social events that the dictatorial regime restored to their regular conduction and AEK returned on 21 May winning Egaleo by 0–2, which combined with the draw of the red and whites, brought AEK within a breathing distance of 2 points from the top. In the Cup, AEK, like the rest of the teams that reached the round of 16 of the previous season, entered directly into the second round where they defeated with ease Athinaikos and Aspida Xanthi, in the next round, only to be eliminated by the eventual winners, Panathinaikos by a 2–1 defeat at home. If that was not enough, the draw with no goals against Ethnikos at home, as well as the 1–1 at Karaiskakis Stadium against Olympiacos marked the end of the league race, as they finished second with a distance of 3 points from the top.

AEK also competed in the Balkans Cup of the season, placed in the 2nd group alongside FK Vardar, Lokomotiv Sofia and Farul Constanța. They manage to finish first undefeated as they achieved 3 wins and 3 draws and qualified for the 2-legged final, facing Fenerbahçe. In he first game at Nea Filadelfeia, AEK won by 2–1 and went to Istanbul to defend their slight lead. The Turks managed to equalize the lead of the first leg, winning by 1–0 and since the away goals rule was not applied in the tournament, a third match was set. In order for a free date for the match to be found, 7 months had to pass and on 30 May 1968 at Mithat Paşa, AEK were defeated by 3–1 and a lost a great opportunity to win an international trophy, that in those years had not yet lost its glory.

Players

Squad information

NOTE: The players are the ones that have been announced by the AEK Athens' press release. No edits should be made unless a player arrival or exit is announced. Updated 31 December 1967, 23:59 UTC+2.

Transfers

In

Out

Loan out

Overall transfer activity

Expenditure:  ₯0

Income:  ₯0

Net Total:  ₯0

Pre-season and friendlies

Alpha Ethniki

League table

Results summary

Results by Matchday

Fixtures

Greek Cup

Matches

European Cup Winners' Cup

First round

Balkans Cup

Group B

Matches

Group stage

Finals

Statistics

Squad statistics

! colspan="13" style="background:#FFDE00; text-align:center" | Goalkeepers
|-

! colspan="13" style="background:#FFDE00; color:black; text-align:center;"| Defenders
|-

! colspan="13" style="background:#FFDE00; color:black; text-align:center;"| Midfielders
|-

! colspan="13" style="background:#FFDE00; color:black; text-align:center;"| Forwards
|-

! colspan="13" style="background:#FFDE00; color:black; text-align:center;"| Left during season
|-

|}

Disciplinary record

|-
! colspan="20" style="background:#FFDE00; text-align:center" | Goalkeepers

|-
! colspan="20" style="background:#FFDE00; color:black; text-align:center;"| Defenders

|-
! colspan="20" style="background:#FFDE00; color:black; text-align:center;"| Midfielders

|-
! colspan="20" style="background:#FFDE00; color:black; text-align:center;"| Forwards

|-
! colspan="20" style="background:#FFDE00; color:black; text-align:center;"| Left during season

|}

References

External links
AEK Athens F.C. Official Website

AEK Athens F.C. seasons
AEK Athens